Scarborough—Agincourt is a provincial electoral district in Ontario, Canada that has been represented in the Legislative Assembly of Ontario since 1987.

The riding covers the northwest of the Scarborough part of Toronto. It is bounded on the west by Victoria Park Avenue, on the north by the Toronto city limits (Steeles Avenue East), on the east by Midland Avenue, and on the south by Highway 401. It contains the neighbourhoods of Steeles, L'Amoreaux, Tam O'Shanter-Sullivan, Agincourt (west of Midland Avenue) and Milliken (west of Midland Avenue).

Demographics

Population

Total (2006): 111,867
Growth (2001–2006): +1,197 (+1.1%)
Electors:
Federal (2006): 72,895 (65.2%)
Provincial (2007): 73,876 (66%)
Gender* (2001):
Male: 52,525 (47.5%)
Female: 58,145 (52.5%)
Identifiable Groups** (2001):
Visible Minority: 76,195 (69.3%)
Chinese: 41,135 (37.4%)
South Asian: 14,680 (13.3%)
Black: 7,450 (6.8%)
Filipino: 3,470 (3.2%)
West Asian: 1,830 (1.7%)
Arab: 1,775 (1.6%)
Other Visible Minority: 1,560 (1.4%)
Multiple Visible Minorities: 1,385 (1.3%)
Latin American: 825 (0.8%)
Southeast Asian: 800 (0.7%)
Korean: 670 (0.6%)
Japanese: 625 (0.6%)
Aboriginal: 185 (0.2%)
Immigrant: 70,315 (63.9%)
Non-Permanent Residents: 1,780 (1.6%)

Language

Mother Tongue** (2001):
English: 39,880 (36.3%)
French: 775 (0.7%)
Non-Official Languages: 66,755 (60.7%)
Multiple Responses: 2,590 (2.4%)

Knowledge of Official Languages** (2001):
English only: 92,290 (83.9%)
Neither English nor French: 10,855 (9.9%)
English and French: 6,755 (6.1%)
French only: 105 (0.001%)

Home Language** (2001):
English: 42,110 (38.3%)
Non-official languages: 34,760 (31.6%)
English and non-official language: 31,875 (29%)
English and French: 625 (0.6%)
English, French and non-official language: 430 (0.4%)
French: 110 (0.1%)
French and non-official language: 85 (0.1%)

Education

Education*** (2001):
Less than High School: 29,385 (32.6%)
High School: 22,950 (25%)
Trade School: 5,205 (5.7%)
College: 11,775 (12.8%)
University: 22,530 (24.5%)

Income and work

Labour Force*** (2001):
Participation: 55,510 (60.4%)
Employed: 50,840 (55.4%)
Unemployed: 4,670 (8.4%)

Average Income*** (2001):
Individual: $26,473
Household: $62,836
Family: $60,742

Median Income (2007):
Household: $51,762

Families and dwellings

Persons per Family (2001): 3.1

Occupied Private Dwellings (2001):
Total: 35,615
Owned: 23,670 (66.5%)
Rented: 11,945 (33.5%)
Average Value: $226,053

Religion

Religion** (2001):
Christian: 58,125 (52.8%)
Catholic: 24,660 (22.4%)
Protestant: 19,670 (17.9%)
Christian Orthodox: 7,365 (6.7%)
Christian n.i.e.****: 6,430 (5.8%)
No Religious Affiliation: 31,220 (28.4%)
Hindu: 7,300 (6.6%)
Muslim: 6,740 (6.1%)
Buddhist: 5,515 (5%)
Eastern Religions: 380 (0.3%)
Sikh: 360 (0.3%)
Jewish: 330 (0.3%)
Other Religions: 30 (0.03%)

* Based on a total population of 110,670
** Based on a projected population of 109,995 (20% sample data projected from the total population)
*** Based on a projected population of 91,840 (20% sample data projected from the population 15 years and over)
**** Includes mostly answers of 'Christian,' not otherwise stated.

{|-

History

The provincial electoral district was created in 1999 when provincial ridings were defined to have the same borders as federal ridings.

Members of Provincial Parliament

Election results

		

	

|align="left" colspan=2| Liberal hold 
|align="right"|Swing
|align="right"|  +1.07
|

^ Change based on redistributed results

2007 electoral reform referendum

Historic election results

References

External links
Elections Ontario Past Election Results
Map of riding for 2018 election

Ontario provincial electoral districts
Provincial electoral districts of Toronto
Scarborough, Toronto